Groundwater discharge is the volumetric flow rate of groundwater through an aquifer.

Total groundwater discharge, as reported through a specified area, is similarly expressed as:

where
Q is the total groundwater discharge ([L3·T−1]; m3/s),
K is the hydraulic conductivity of the aquifer ([L·T−1]; m/s),
dh/dl is the hydraulic gradient ([L·L−1]; unitless), and 
A is the area which the groundwater is flowing through ([L2]; m2)

For example, this can be used to determine the flow rate of water flowing along a plane with known geometry.

The discharge potential 
The discharge potential is a potential in groundwater mechanics which links the physical properties, hydraulic head, with a mathematical formulation for the energy as a function of position. The discharge potential,  [L3·T−1], is defined in such way that its gradient equals the discharge vector.

Thus the hydraulic head may be calculated in terms of the discharge potential, for confined flow as

and for unconfined shallow flow as

where

 is the thickness of the aquifer [L], 
 is the hydraulic head [L], and
 is an arbitrary constant [L3·T−1] given by the boundary conditions.

As mentioned the discharge potential may also be written in terms of position. The discharge potential is a function of the Laplace's equation

which solution is a linear differential equation. Because the solution is a linear differential equation for which superposition principle holds, it may be combined with other solutions for the discharge potential, e.g. uniform flow, multiple wells, analytical elements (analytic element method).

See also
Groundwater flow equation
Groundwater energy balance
Submarine groundwater discharge
Discharge (hydrology)
Flux (transport definition)
Darcy's Law

References

 Freeze, R.A. & Cherry, J.A., 1979. Groundwater, Prentice-Hall. 

Hydrology
Aquifers